Christine Lake is a lake in Cook County, Minnesota, in the United States.

Christine Lake was named for the daughter of the county school superintendent.

See also
List of lakes in Minnesota

References

Lakes of Minnesota
Lakes of Cook County, Minnesota